The discography of The Vandals, a punk rock band formed in Huntington Beach, California, in 1980, consists of ten studio albums, one EP, two live albums, two compilation albums, one remix album, four reissued albums, three videos, four singles, and seven music videos.

The Vandals formed in 1980 with an initial lineup of singer Steven Ronald "Stevo" Jensen, guitarist Jan Nils Ackermann, bassist Steve "Human" Pfauter, and drummer Joe Escalante. Their debut EP Peace thru Vandalism was released in 1982 on Epitaph Records. Pfauter left the band in 1984 and Brent Turner played on their debut album When in Rome Do as the Vandals, released on National Trust Records in 1984. By the time of their second album Slippery When Ill (1989) on Restless Records Robbi Allen was playing bass and Jensen had been replaced by Dave Quackenbush. The album was country and western-influenced in a style the band called "cowpunk". More lineup changes ensued leaving Esclante and Quackenbush as the only remaining members, with Escalante now on bass guitar. A legal conflict ensued between Escalante and several of the ex-members, partially concerning Time Bomb Recordings' release of the compilation album Peace thru Vandalism / When in Rome Do as the Vandals. Escalante emerged with legal rights to The Vandals name and catalog.

A new incarnation of the Vandals coalesced with the addition of guitarist Warren Fitzgerald and drummer Josh Freese. This lineup would remain consistent for the rest of the band's career, with occasional substitutes filling in for Freese. In 1990 they released Fear of a Punk Planet through Triple X Records and filmed their first music video, for the song "Pizza Tran". In 1994 they released the live album and video Sweatin' to the Oldies. In 1995 the band signed to Nitro Records, who would put out four of their next five albums. Live Fast, Diarrhea was released in 1995, followed by The Quickening in 1996. Also in 1996 Escalante and Fitzgerald founded Kung Fu Records, releasing a Vandals split single with Assorted Jelly Beans and the Christmas album Oi to the World!, and re-releasing Sweatin' to the Oldies in 1997. Nitro released Hitler Bad, Vandals Good in 1998, and Kung Fu released most of Slippery When Ill in 1999 as The Vandals Play Really Bad Original Country Tunes. 2000 saw a trio of releases, with Kung Fu putting out an anniversary edition of Fear of a Punk Planet and re-releasing Oi to the World! while Nitro released the new album Look What I Almost Stepped In...

With their Nitro contract fulfilled The Vandals moved to Kung Fu, releasing Internet Dating Superstuds in 2002 and the live album and DVD Live at the House of Blues in 2003. The Shingo Japanese Remix Album was released in 2005, made up of remixes of Vandals songs by Japanese DJ Shingo Asari. The band's most recent release is the compilation BBC Sessions and Other Polished Turds, a digital-only release through iTunes and Kung Fu in 2008.

Studio albums 

I When in Rome Do as the Vandals was reissued on CD by Time Bomb Recordings in 1989 as part of the compilation album Peace thru Vandalism / When in Rome Do as the Vandals.

II Most of the material from Slippery When Ill was re-released by Kung Fu Records in 1999 on The Vandals Play Really Bad Original Country Tunes.

III A tenth-anniversary edition of Fear of a Punk Planet was released by Kung Fu Records in 2000.

IV Oi to the World! was re-released by Kung Fu Records in 2000.

Live albums 

I Sweatin' to the Oldies was released as both a live album and VHS video. A Special Edition re-release of the album was put out by Kung Fu Records in 1997, and a DVD version of the video was released in 2002.

II Live at the House of Blues is a CD/DVD combination package released as Episode 9 of Kung Fu Films' The Show Must Go Off! series.

Compilation albums 

I Peace thru Vandalism / When in Rome Do as the Vandals combines the EP Peace thru Vandalism and the album When in Rome Do as the Vandals.

II BBC Sessions and Other Polished Turds was released only as a digital download through iTunes and Kung Fu Records.

Extended plays 

I Peace thru Vandalism was reissued on CD by Time Bomb Recordings in 1989 as part of the compilation album Peace thru Vandalism / When in Rome Do as the Vandals.

Singles

Video albums 

I A DVD version of Sweatin' to the Oldies was released by Kung Fu Records in 2002.

II Live at the House of Blues is a DVD/CD combination package released as Episode 9 of Kung Fu Films' The Show Must Go Off! series.

Remix albums

Reissues 

I The Vandals Play Really Bad Original Country Tunes is essentially a re-release of Slippery When Ill, with 8 of that album's 10 songs plus 2 new ones.

Music videos

Other appearances 
The following Vandals songs were released on compilation albums, film soundtracks, and other releases. Some songs were later re-released on the BBC Sessions and Other Polished Turds compilation album, as noted below. This is not an exhaustive list: songs that were first released on the band's albums, EPs, or singles are not included.

I No soundtrack album was issued for the film.

III The Vandals tracks only appeared on limited 2 LP release with bonus 7-inch and Japanese CD release. These Vandals tracks were later released on the Longfellow split 7-inch

II Denotes songs that were re-released on BBC Sessions and Other Polished Turds.

References

General references

Notes

External links 
 
 

Discography
Punk rock group discographies
Discographies of American artists